Vicente Mir Arnau (born 3 June 1968) is a Spanish retired footballer who played as a forward, currently manager of Torrent CF.

Apart from one appearance for Valencia in La Liga, he spent his entire career as a player and manager in the lower divisions, totalling 52 goals in 246 Segunda División B games in service of five clubs.

In 2004, Mir started working as a coach.

Playing career
Born in Meliana, Valencian Community, Mir was a youth product of local giants Valencia CF. After several seasons as a senior with the reserves he started his professional career with Palamós CF of the Segunda División, on loan.

Upon his return to the Che for the 1991–92 campaign, Mir was again almost exclusively associated with the B side. Main squad manager Guus Hiddink handed him his La Liga debut on 8 September 1991, and he played 31 minutes in a 1–0 away loss against Albacete Balompié after coming on as a substitute for Rommel Fernández.

Mir spent the remainder of his career in the Spanish lower leagues, competing almost exclusively in his native region and representing mainly Elche CF (three seasons). He retired at the end of 2001–02 with Villajoyosa CF, in the Tercera División.

Coaching career
Mir was appointed director of youth football at Benidorm CF in 2002, remaining in the position several years. Afterwards, he took the reins of Alicante CF's reserves, promoting from the regional championships in his first year and nearly achieving the feat the following campaign, with a team full of youngsters.

For 2010–11, Mir joined Valencia B, leading the club to Segunda División B at the first attempt. He was relieved of his duties in December 2011, having recorded four wins, four draws and nine defeats during the season.

In 2012, Mir moved to fellow reserve team Elche CF Ilicitano, and in his first season he led them to a historic promotion to the third division. The following campaign they went unbeaten at home, but lost the play-off place to UE Llagostera on the last day, and he was sacked following relegation in May 2015.

Mir returned to the city of Alicante on 18 January 2016, being hired by third-tier club Hércules CF on 18 January 2016. He was dismissed on 27 June after defeat to Cádiz CF in the play-off final.

Mir was appointed by third level strugglers Real Murcia on 26 February 2017, replacing the fired Paco García. After guiding them to the playoffs he switched to Elche on 15 June, who dismissed him five months later.

On 30 May 2018, Mir was named CD Alcoyano manager. He left the following 27 February by mutual consent, when a 4–1 loss at fellow strugglers CD Teruel put the team one point off the relegation play-offs.

Mir returned for a second spell at Hércules on 9 December 2019, replacing Jesús Muñoz who had been fired earlier the same day. He lasted only until the following 11 February when, within 24 hours of a public vote of confidence from the board, he was dismissed from a team five points adrift in the relegation places.

Managerial statistics

References

External links

1968 births
Living people
People from Horta Nord
Sportspeople from the Province of Valencia
Spanish footballers
Footballers from the Valencian Community
Association football forwards
La Liga players
Segunda División players
Segunda División B players
Tercera División players
Valencia CF Mestalla footballers
Palamós CF footballers
Valencia CF players
Elche CF players
CD Alcoyano footballers
Yeclano CF players
Benidorm CF footballers
Villajoyosa CF footballers
Spanish football managers
Segunda División B managers
Tercera División managers
Tercera Federación players
Valencia CF Mestalla managers
Elche CF Ilicitano managers
Hércules CF managers
Real Murcia managers
Elche CF managers
CD Alcoyano managers
Águilas FC managers
Valencia CF non-playing staff